Tommy Lee Pharr (born July 31, 1947) is a former American football defensive back and quarterback that played for the Buffalo Bills of the National Football League (NFL) in 1970 and the Winnipeg Blue Bombers of the Canadian Football League from 1972 to 1974. Pharr played college football at Mississippi State.

References

External links
Pro-Football-Reference

1947 births
Living people
American football defensive backs
Buffalo Bills players
Mississippi State Bulldogs football players
American football quarterbacks
Winnipeg Blue Bombers players